Bolt Creative, Inc. is an American video game developer based in San Francisco. It was founded by Dave Castelnuovo and Andrew Donley in 2001, originally to develop Adobe Flash games. Dave and Allan Dye shifted to iOS development in October 2008. The company is best known for Pocket God, which Castelnuovo and Dye created in less than a week in January 2009.

Games developed

References

External links 
 

Companies based in San Francisco
Video game companies of the United States
Video game development companies